Rocca d'Arce is a comune (municipality) in the Province of Frosinone in the Italian region Lazio, located about  southeast of Rome and about  southeast of Frosinone.

Rocca d'Arce borders the following municipalities: Arce, Colfelice, Fontana Liri, Roccasecca, Santopadre.

History 
According to the archeologist Italo Biddittu, human presence is evidenced during the Copper Age, whilst a settlement arose in the Iron Age. 

The Volsci built a fortress around the mountain, still partially visible today. Due to its strategic position, the fortress had a moderate importance in the medieval period.

Demographics 
According to the 2011 census, there were 971 inhabitants.

References

Cities and towns in Lazio